Osipovo is a rural locality (a selo) in Klyazminskoye Rural Settlement, Kovrovsky District, Vladimir Oblast, Russia. The population was 176 as of 2010.

Geography 
Osipovo is located 13 km east of Kovrov (the district's administrative centre) by road. Kanabyevo is the nearest rural locality.

References 

Rural localities in Kovrovsky District